"Something in Your Eyes" is a song by Richard Carpenter, released as the first single from his debut solo album, Time. It reportedly was to have been the lead single off the Carpenters' album Voice of the Heart; however, Karen Carpenter died before having had the opportunity to lay down a vocal track (although, according to Richard's album notes, Karen had been very excited and looking forward to recording the song). Richard ultimately chose Dusty Springfield to record the vocal in conjunction with his arrangement, backing vocals and instrumentation. It peaked at number 12 on the US Adult Contemporary chart.

Charts

References

1987 debut singles
The Carpenters songs
Dusty Springfield songs
Songs written by Richard Carpenter (musician)
A&M Records singles
1987 songs